Monceau Castle can refer to a château in the following places in Belgium:

 Château de Monceau, Monceau-sur-Sambre, city of Charleroi, province of Hainaut 
 Château de Monceau, Monceau-Imbrechies, municipality of Momignies, province of Hainaut
 Château de Monceau, Juseret, municipality of Vaux-sur-Sûre, province of Luxembourg